Douglas C. Waller is an author, lecturer, and former correspondent for Time magazine and Newsweek.

Biography
Douglas Waller was born on June 30, 1949, in Norfolk, Virginia, and holds a B.A. in English from Wake Forest University, as well as an M.A. in Urban Administration from the University of North Carolina at Charlotte.

Waller describes himself as a veteran correspondent, author and lecturer. From 1994 to 2007, Waller served in TIME Magazine's Washington Bureau, where he covered foreign affairs as a diplomatic correspondent. He came to TIME in 1994 from Newsweek, where he reported on major military conflicts. Waller joined Newsweek in 1988, after serving as a legislative assistant on the staffs of Senator William Proxmire and Representative Edward J. Markey.

In a review posted online on June 25, 2015, Kirkus Reviews described his book Disciples as "one of the more interesting spy books this year." In the October 3–4, 2015 "Five Best" column in The Wall Street Journal Books section, Waller presented his personal choice of what he considered to be the five best works on American espionage in World War II.

Private life
Waller and his wife, Judy, live in Raleigh, North Carolina.

Bibliography

Reports
 SDI: PROGRESS AND CHALLENGES with Douglas Cook and James Bruce (March 1986)

Books 
Commandos: The Making of America's Secret Soldiers, from Training to Desert Storm (1994) 
Air Warriors: The Inside Story of the Making of a Navy Pilot (1998) 
Big Red: The Three-Month Voyage of a Trident Nuclear Submarine (2001) 
A Question of Loyalty: Gen. Billy Mitchell and the Court-Martial that Gripped the Nation (2004) 
Wild Bill Donovan: The Spymaster Who Created the OSS and Modern American Espionage (2011) Free Press 
Disciples: The World War II Missions of the CIA Directors Who Fought for Wild Bill Donovan (2015) Simon & Schuster

Reviews and Criticism of Waller's work

See also
  Strategic Defense Initiative

References

External links
Douglas's official website

Year of birth missing (living people)
Living people
American military writers